Karim Saoula (born May 19, 1975 in Oran, Algeria) is a former Algerian footballer and the current goalkeeping coach of MC Oran.

Honours

Club
MC Oran
 Arab Cup Winners' Cup (2): 1997, 1998

JSM Béjaïa
 Algerian Cup (1): 2007–08

References

External links
 

1975 births
Algerian footballers
Living people
Algeria international footballers
JSM Béjaïa players
WA Tlemcen players
ASM Oran players
MC Oran players
MC Alger players
USM Alger players
Association football goalkeepers
21st-century Algerian people